Sweden competed at the 1900 Summer Olympics in Paris under the IOC country code SWE.  It was the second appearance of the European nation.  Swedish results are typically separated from those of Norwegian competitors despite the personal union of the two kingdoms.

Medalists
Gold medals were not given at the 1900 Games.  A silver medal was given for first place, and a bronze medal was given for second.  The International Olympic Committee has retroactively assigned gold, silver, and bronze medals to competitors who earned 1st, 2nd, and 3rd-place finishes, respectively, in order to bring early Olympics in line with current awards.

Gold

Also three Swedish athletes, August Nilsson, Gustaf Söderström and Karl Gustaf Staaf, were part of a mixed team with three Danish athletes that won the Tug of War competition.

Results by event

Aquatics

Swimming

Sweden was represented by one swimmer in its first Olympic swimming appearance. Erickson advanced to the final in two of his three events, but won no medals.

Athletics

8 Swedish athletes competed in 11 events, winning a bronze medal in the marathon.

 Track and road events

 Field events

Fencing

Sweden first competed in fencing at the Olympics in the sport's second appearance.  The nation sent one fencer.

Tug of war

Sweden contributed 3 of the 6 members of the gold medal-winning team in the inaugural tug of war competition.

References

Nations at the 1900 Summer Olympics
1900
Olympics